The Leisure Hive is the first serial of the 18th season of the British science fiction television series Doctor Who, which was first broadcast in four weekly parts on BBC1 from 30 August to 20 September 1980. It marks the return of John Leeson as the voice of K9.

In the serial, a criminal organisation of alien Foamasi, called the West Lodge, attempt to buy the planet Argolis from the Argolin people there as a West Lodge base. Meanwhile, the young Argolin Pangol (David Haig) seeks to start a war against the Foamasi his people had previously lost to with an army made up of clones of himself.

Plot

The Fourth Doctor and Romana's holiday in Brighton ends abruptly when K9 chases a ball, takes in seawater, and explodes. They instead venture to the Leisure Hive of Argolis, a holiday complex and message of peace built by surviving Argolins after their devastating 20-minute war with the Foamasi forty years earlier. They arrive at a point of crisis: the Leisure Hive is facing bankruptcy (because of falling tourist trade due to stiff competition from other leisure planets) and the Argolins' Earth agent, Brock, and his lawyer Klout have arrived bearing an offer to buy the planet outright. However, the offer is from the Foamasi, the only species that could live on the planet's radiation-infused surface, and the Argolin board will not consider it. The shock of events causes Board Chairman Morix's rapid death – from the Argolin war curse of advanced cellular degradation – and his consort Mena is declared the new Chairman. The Doctor is intrigued by the manipulation of tachyons in the Hive’s Tachyon Recreation Generator, which is the main tourist attraction and can duplicate and manipulate organic matter. He witnesses a human tourist being killed after it is sabotaged in the latest of a series of such acts.

When Mena returns to Argolis, her body clock begins to speed up, a side-effect of the radiation-heavy atmosphere. Earth scientist Hardin has been brought to Argolis to help her and her people by using time experiments to rejuvenate a people rendered sterile by the war. Recognising their value as scientists, Mena, instead of confining them, engages the Doctor and Romana to help Hardin with his work. The time travellers know Hardin has been faking his work, but Romana feels that the experiments should have worked.

After discovering a skin of Klout in a wardrobe, Stimson, Hardin's financier, who travelled with him and persuaded him to fake the demonstrations, is brutally murdered and the Doctor is blamed. He is put on trial while Romana and Hardin perfect the time experiments. Just in time, they succeed and are able to bargain for the Doctor's freedom. However, after they leave, the hourglass of their experiment shatters. Due to her worsening condition, Mena volunteers to be the first guinea pig to test the time experiment, but the Doctor is selected instead. The machine malfunctions while he is inside and he emerges – having aged 500 years – an old man with flowing white hair. Mena's son, Pangol, the most warlike and vindictive of the Argolins, orders that the Doctor and Romana be confined. Hardin later frees them, which is when the slower-witted Doctor notices something odd about the name Recreation Chamber. Romana sees it too, eventually: recreation is re-creation, the repeated creation of things or people.

Sneaking back to the Recreation Room, the trio discover a group of Argolins, led by Pangol, performing dangerous experiments in order to perfect a secret project, under the guise of entertainment. Meanwhile, Brock and Klout bring a new offer from a mysterious organisation called West Lodge. It is then, while tearing up the offer, that Pangol reveals the secret of his past and the reason he is the only young Argolin in the Hive. He was the only successful, undeformed child from a cloning experiment meant to save the Argolin using the Recreation Generator. But, driven insane by hatred of the Foamasi and a xenophobic fear of all aliens, he lusts for a war-forged empire like that of their ancestor Theron (who started the war and doomed the Argolins to extinction). He needs an alien witness to his taking Mena's place after her death, and to the beginning of "New Argolis".

The Doctor, Romana, and Hardin find Foamasi agents in the Hive and escort them to the council chamber, where the agents reveal Brock and Klout to be Foamasi impersonators. The lead agent reveals West Lodge to be a criminal group who need Argolis as a base of operations. With the leader, Brock, captured, the organisation is doomed to fold and the Foamasi prepare to take the rogues for trial. Pangol refuses to let them pass, and takes up the Helmet of Theron (a sacred symbol for Argolins and a reminder to espouse peace and understanding) and rallies the Argolins to his cause. The Doctor, seeing what he is up to, takes the Randomiser from the TARDIS and attaches it to the Recreation Chamber, hoping to destabilise the mechanism.

Romana tries to dissuade Pangol from using the Generator, but fails. The Foamasi shuttle tries to leave and is destroyed by Pangol, who dons the Helmet of Theron and uses the Generator to create an army of Tachyon replicas, in order to rebuild the Argolin race. He orders that Romana be put outside, while Hardin finds Mena dying and carries her to the Generator room. As Romana is taken, the clones are revealed to be merely tachyon images of a rejuvenated Doctor built up in a FIFO stack; first in, first out. She and the first Doctor to emerge (the real one) return to the Generator Room, where Hardin has put Mena into the Recreation Generator.

Pangol, enraged that the Doctor has foiled his attempt to create an army, reenters the Generator, which closes behind him. The Doctor reveals that he set the machine to "rejuvenate", and it cannot be stopped. Pangol and Mena seem to be merging, so the Doctor grabs the Helmet of Theron and throws it into the visualising crystal, stopping the mechanism. Mena exits rejuvenated, holding Pangol, who has regressed to a baby. The Foamasi agents reappear, revealing that the West Lodge criminals tried to escape in the shuttle (so, in the words of the Doctor "Brock and Klout are kaput"). Against Romana's advice, the Doctor leaves the Argolins and Foamasi to make up and the Randomiser attached to the Recreation Generator (thus leaving the TARDIS vulnerable to the Black Guardian).

Production

Working titles for this story included The Argolins and Avalon. Writer David Fisher conceived of the Foamasi as a race of criminals. "Foamasi" is a near-anagram of "mafioso". The episode was written as a satire of the decline of tourism in the United Kingdom in the 1970s. The alien costume used for the Foamasi was later reused in the 1981 BBC The Hitchhiker's Guide to the Galaxy as the leader of the G'Gugvuntt.

A new TARDIS prop is introduced in this episode which replaces the one used since The Masque of Mandragora (1976). This prop would be used right until the end of the original series' production in 1989. The Randomiser, which had been introduced in The Armageddon Factor, was ditched in Part Four of this story. This was also the first story to use the Quantel DPE 5000 digital image processing system. Filming on the story ran badly over budget. The opening sequence on Brighton beach is John Nathan-Turner's paean to Visconti's celebrated 1971 feature film, Death in Venice.

Format changes
This was the first Doctor Who story which John Nathan-Turner produced.  Nathan-Turner was keen to get away from what he considered the excessive silliness of recent Doctor Who stories, and wanted to increase the series' production values, because he felt that they were poor when compared with glossy American science-fiction series. Among the changes Nathan-Turner instituted was the scaling back of K9's appearances (the unit is out of commission for most of this serial), eventually writing the character out in Warriors' Gate. Nathan-Turner would produce Doctor Who until 1989.

In a further attempt to update the image of the series, the original 1963 Delia Derbyshire arrangement of the theme music was replaced by a more contemporary-sounding arrangement by Peter Howell, and a new, '80s-styled neon tubing logo (which was en-vogue at the time) designed by Sid Sutton replaced the diamond logo most associated with the Fourth Doctor. The updated title sequence is most associated with the Fifth Doctor.

Tom Baker, Lalla Ward, Barry Letts, and Christopher H. Bidmead all protested John Nathan-Turner's decision to add question-marks to Baker's shirts, arguing that it was gimmicky. Baker in particular was unhappy with it and told Nathan-Turner that it was "annoying, absurd, and ridiculous", while Bidmead later called it "a silly, quite absurd gimmick really". Bidmead, who found working with Tom Baker "difficult to say the very least", supposedly told Baker and Nathan-Turner during recording of The Leisure Hive that exclamation marks would have been more appropriate for Baker's shirts. The Seventh Doctor Sylvester McCoy would later protest his question-mark adorned jumper in similar terms, but the question-mark motif would remain until the end of the classic series in 1989. Baker also disliked his new scarf, requesting that his old multi-coloured one be re-instated, but expressed gratitude to costume designer June Hudson for refusing to adhere to Nathan-Turner's demands to ditch the trademark scarf altogether and managing to find a compromise.

The show's stars took exception to many of John Nathan-Turner's other changes as well, with Tom Baker and Lalla Ward criticising the change in theme music and opening titles. Baker also criticised the new synthesised incidental music, comparing it unfavourably to Dudley Simpson's earlier scores. Ward later complained that Nathan-Turner had "removed all the lovely humour", while Baker said that he wanted the scripts to improve and regain some of the quality of the Philip Hinchcliffe era, as he felt that the quality of the scripts and storylines had declined under Graham Williams. He later said that he felt such improvements did not by and large occur, and that most of Nathan-Turner's changes were either cosmetic or misguided. Many of the new special effects introduced in this story were never used again to the extent on display here.

Cast notes
Laurence Payne had previously played Johnny Ringo in The Gunfighters (1966) and later played Dastari in The Two Doctors (1985). Nigel Lambert would later voice the 'Priest Triangle' in "War of the Sontarans" and "Once, Upon Time".

Commercial releases

In print

David Fisher's novelisation was published by Target Books in July 1982. It keeps many elements of the original script that were intended as a spoof on the Mafia. The original name of Argolis is given as Xbrrrm.

Home media
The Leisure Hive was released on VHS in January 1997, on DVD in July 2004, and as part of the Doctor Who DVD Files (issue 98) in October 2012. Peter Howell's incidental music was released as part of the compilation album Doctor Who at the BBC Radiophonic Workshop Volume 3: The Leisure Hive in 2002.

References

External links

Target novelisation

Doctor Who serials novelised by David Fisher (writer)
Fourth Doctor serials
1980 British television episodes
Television shows set in Brighton